Macoma is a large genus of saltwater clams, marine bivalve molluscs in the family Tellinidae, the tellins.

Species 
According to the World Register of Marine Species (WoRMS), the following species are included as accepted names within the genus Macoma:
Macoma acolasta Dall, 1921 – morsel macoma
Macoma awaijiensis (Sowerby, 1914)
Macoma biota Arruda & Domaneschi, 2005
Macoma brota Dall, 1916 – heavy macoma
Macoma bruuni Nickles, 1955
Macoma calcarea (Gmelin, 1791) – chalky macoma
Macoma cancellata (G. B. Sowerby I, 1853)
Macoma candida (Lamarck, 1818)
Macoma carlottensis Whiteaves, 1880 – Charlotte macoma
Macoma cerina Dall, 1900 – waxy macoma
Macoma cleryana (d'Orbigny, 1846)
Macoma coani Kafanov & Lutaenko, 1999
Macoma consociata (Smith, 1885)
Macoma constricta (Bruguière, 1792) – constricted macoma
Macoma crassula  (Deshayes, 1855) – thick macoma
Macoma cumana (Costa O.G., 1829)
Macoma dexioptera Baxter, 1977
Macoma dubia (Deshayes, 1854)
Macoma ecuadoriana Pilsbry & Olsson, 1941
Macoma elimata Dunnill & Coan, 1968
Macoma elytrum Keen, 1958
Macoma expansa Carpenter, 1864
Macoma extenuata Dall, 1900 – slender macoma
Macoma georgiana Dell, 1964
Macoma golikovi Scarlato & Kafanov, 1941 
Macoma hanleyi (Dunker, 1853)
Macoma hemicilla (Iredale, 1936)
Macoma hesperus Dall, 1908
Macoma hokkaidoensis Amano, Lutaenko & Matsubara, 1999
Macoma incongrua (Martens, 1865)
Macoma indentata Carpenter, 1864
Macoma inexpectata Cosel, 1995
Macoma inornata (Hanley, 1844)
Macoma inquinata (Deshayes, 1855)
Macoma lama Bartsch, 1929 – Aleutian macoma
Macoma lamproleuca (Pilsbry & Lowe, 1932)
Macoma limula Dall, 1895 – little-file macoma
Macoma lipara Dall, 1916
Macoma litoralis (Krauss, 1848)
Macoma loveni (A. S. Jensen, 1905) – inflated macoma, loven macoma
Macoma lucerna (Hanley, 1844)
Macoma melo (Sowerby G.B. II, 1866)
Macoma middendorffi Dall, 1884
Macoma mitchelli Dall, 1895 – Matagorda macoma, mitchell macoma
Macoma moesta (Deshayes, 1855) – flat macoma
Macoma murrayana (Salisbury, 1934)
Macoma nasuta (Conrad, 1837) – bent-nosed clam
Macoma nobilis (Hanley, 1845)
Macoma obliqua (J. Sowerby, 1817)
Macoma panamensis Dall, 1900
Macoma phenax Dall, 1900 – cheating macoma
Macoma praetexta (Martens, 1865)
Macoma pseudofallax Cosel, 1995
Macoma pseudomera Dall & Simpson, 1901 – mera macoma
Macoma pulleyi Boyer, 1969 – delta macoma, pulley macoma
Macoma retrorsa (G. B. Sowerby II, 1867)
Macoma secta (Conrad, 1837)
Macoma shiratoriensis (Matsubara, 1994)
Macoma siliqua (C. B. Adams, 1852)
Macoma subovata (Sowerby, 1867)
Macoma tageliformis Dall, 1900 – tagelus macoma
Macoma takahokoensis Yamamoto & Habe, 1959
Macoma tenta (Say, 1834) – elongate macoma
Macoma tokyoensis Makiyama, 1927
Macoma torelli (Jensen, 1905) – triangular macoma
Macoma uruguayensis (E. A. Smith, 1885)
Macoma vappa (Iredale, 1929)
Macoma ventricosa (Deshayes, 1855)
Macoma yoldiformis Carpenter, 1864

References

Tellinidae
Bivalve genera